Jervis Bay Airfield  is a military aerodrome in the Jervis Bay Territory in Australia.

It was opened in 1941 as a satellite airfield of Royal Australian Air Force Base Nowra (now HMAS Albatross). It was primarily used to support torpedo training by No. 6 Operational Training Unit RAAF and search and rescue operations during World War II. During 1945 it was home to the Royal Navy Mobile Naval Air Base MONAB V (HMS Nabswick) and several Fleet Air Arm squadrons of the British Pacific Fleet.

The airfield was transferred to the Royal Australian Navy (RAN) in 1948. It continued to be used as a base for the RAN's GAF Jindivik pilotless target aircraft. Today the RAN's British Aerospace MQM-107E Kalkara Flight is based at the airfield, along with the RAN School of Ship Survivability and Safety that has fire and damage control (flooding) training facilities.

See also
 List of airports in territories of Australia

References

Airports in territories of Australia
Jervis Bay Territory